Doctor X may refer to:

 Doctor X (film), a 1932 Technicolor film starring Lee Tracy, Fay Wray and Lionel Atwill
 Alan E. Nourse, who used "Doctor X" as the pseudonym of his 1965 journal Intern
 Doctor X (wrestler), ring name of Mexican professional wrestler Clemente Valencia
 "Doctor X", a ring name of professional wrestler Dick Beyer
 "Doctor X", a ring name of professional wrestler Tom Prichard
 Dr. X (Action Man), the arch-enemy of the 1993–2006 Action Man revival toy line
 Dr. X, a pseudonym for Doctor Mario Jascalevich, accused of several patient murders
 Dr. X, the primary antagonist of the Queensryche albums Operation: Mindcrime and Operation: Mindcrime 2
 Dr. X, a mysterious illicit nanotechnology specialist from Neal Stephenson's novel The Diamond Age
 Doctor-X (TV series), a Japanese medical drama
 Ted Mosby, How I Met Your Mother character whose aliases include Doctor X

See also 
 Mister X (disambiguation)